Garisan is a mountain in Gangwon-do, South Korea. It sits on the boundary between the city of Chuncheon and the county of Hongcheon.

See also
 List of mountains in Korea

Notes

References 
 

Mountains of Gangwon Province, South Korea
Chuncheon
Hongcheon County
Mountains of South Korea
One-thousanders of South Korea